Protortalotrypeta is a monotypic genus of tephritid  or fruit flies in the family Tephritidae. It contains the species Protortalotrypeta grimaldii.

References

Tachiniscinae
Tephritidae genera